John Kenneth George Hastie (6 September 1928 – 2 October 2002) was a South African footballer who played as a centre forward.

Career
In August 1952, Hastie signed for Leeds United from South African club Clyde Athletic after impressing for South Africa the previous year, during a Newcastle United tour of the country. On 17 September 1952, Hastie made his debut for Leeds against Birmingham City in a Second Division game, scoring twice in a 2–2 draw. Hastie only made three more league appearances for the club, due, in part, to the emergence of John Charles. At the end of the 1952–53 season, Hastie was released by Leeds, returning to South Africa to play for Germiston Callies.

References

1928 births
2002 deaths
South African soccer players
White South African people
Sportspeople from Cape Town
South African expatriate soccer players
Expatriate footballers in England
South African expatriate sportspeople in England
South Africa international soccer players
Association football forwards
Leeds United F.C. players
Germiston Callies F.C. players
English Football League players